The cutaneous branches of the radial nerve are two in number:

 Posterior brachial cutaneous nerve
 Posterior antebrachial cutaneous nerve